= Raymonde Godin =

Canadian artist (1930–2023)

- Born: December 23, 1930; Montreal, Quebec, Canada
- Died: January 31, 2023 (aged 92)
- Education: School of Art and Design at the Montreal Museum of Fine Arts
- Known for: Painting
- Style: Abstract

Raymonde Godin (December 23, 1930 – January 31, 2023) was a Canadian artist.

Originally from Quebec, she moved to France in 1954 and lives in the Drôme Provençale. Godin was included in a 2020 exhibit, Women in the 1950s. Through Abstraction, Painting and Sculpture, at the Soulages Museum.

Her work is included in the collections of the Musée national des beaux-arts du Québec, the Musée d'art de Joliette and the National Gallery of Canada.

Godin died on January 31, 2023, at the age of 92.
